Iskandarovo (İskändär) is a rural locality (a selo) in Bik-Karmalinsky Selsoviet, Davlekanovsky District, Bashkortostan, Russia. The population was 254 as of 2010. There are 2 streets.

Geography 
Iskandarovo is located 31 km southeast of Davlekanovo (the district's administrative centre) by road. Khotimlya is the nearest rural locality.

References 

Rural localities in Davlekanovsky District